Morrison Mounds is a historic site located north of Battle Lake, Minnesota, United States. It consists of 22 Indian burial mounds that were built beginning in 800 B.C. There are 20 conical mounds, one flat-topped mound, and one elongated mound near Otter Tail Lake. This site has the oldest radiocarbon date for any mound group in the state of Minnesota. However, its construction is similar to other mound groups in the area which suggests they are all from the same social group that built them over a period of time. Similarities include a central burial pit, logs over the burial pit, and the possibility of partial cremation on-site. The site was listed on the National Register of Historic Places in 1973.

References

Mounds in Minnesota
Woodland period
Native American history of Minnesota
Protected areas of Otter Tail County, Minnesota
National Register of Historic Places in Otter Tail County, Minnesota
Archaeological sites on the National Register of Historic Places in Minnesota